Gujba Forest Reserve is a protected area in Yobe State, Nigeria.

Its headquarters are in the town of Buni Yadi at towards the south of the area; the eponymous town of Gujba lies in the north of the area.

It covers an area of 410 km2.

See also
Natural areas of Nigeria

References

Protected areas of Nigeria